Sartang-e Barzeh (also known as Sar-e Tang) is a village in Zaz-e Gharbi Rural District, Zaz va Mahru District, Aligudarz County, Lorestan Province, Iran. At the 2006 census, its population was 218, in 45 families.

References 

Towns and villages in Aligudarz County